Jevgeņijs Kostigovs (born 20 November 1996) is a Latvian motorcycle speedway rider.

Career
Kostigovs became champion of Latvia in 2018 after winning the Latvian Individual Speedway Championship.

He has won silver and bronze medals at the European Pairs Speedway Championship and was selected for the Latvian team for the 2019 Speedway of Nations and 2022 Speedway of Nations.

Major results

World team Championships
2019 Speedway of Nations - =11th
2022 Speedway of Nations - =9th

See also 
 Latvian national speedway team

References 

1996 births
Living people
Latvian speedway riders